The 2012 United States Olympic trials for track and field were held at Hayward Field in Eugene, Oregon. Organized by USA Track and Field, the ten-day competition lasted from June 21 until July 1 and served as the  national championships in track and field for the United States.

The results of the event determined qualification for the American Olympic team at the 2012 Summer Olympics, to be held in London. Provided they had achieved the Olympic "A" standard, the top three athletes gained a place on the Olympic team. In the event that a leading athlete did not hold an "A" standard, or an athlete withdrew, the next highest finishing athlete with an "A" standard was selected instead.

The trials for the men's and women's marathon were held January 14 in Houston and the trials for the men's 50 km race walk were held January 22 in Santee, California. The hammer throw competitions were held at the Nike facility in Beaverton, Oregon.

Men's results
Key:
.

Men track events

Men field events

Notes
 As a result of Nick Ross not having the "A" standard of 2.31 m, fourth-place finisher Jesse Williams was included on the Olympic team as he had an "A" standard.
 As a result of Scott Roth not having the "A" standard of 5.72 m, fourth-place finisher Derek Miles was included on the Olympic team as he held an "A" standard.
 Brooks was the only individual to throw over the "A" standard of 65.00 m in the competition.  However, Rome and Young threw the "A" standard in earlier competitions.
 Johnson and Kruger were selected for the Olympic team as both had achieved the "A" standard (78.00 m) from earlier competitions.
 Kinsley was included on the Olympic team as he previously held the "A" standard of at least 82.00 m.  In addition, fourth-place finisher Sean Furey (77.86 m) and fifth-place finisher Cyrus Hostetler (77.63 m) was included as they held the "A" standard beforehand.
 Marks for Eaton were: 10.21 (+0.4 m/s) for 100 metres, 8.23 m (+0.8 m/s) for the long jump, 14.20 m for the shot put, 2.05 m for the high jump, 46.70 for 400 metres, 13.70 for the 110 metres hurdles, 42.81 m for the discus throw, 5.30 m for the pole vault, 58.87 m for the javelin throw, and 4:14.48 for the 1500 metres run.  Eaton's performance in the 100 metres and long jump were decathlon bests. He placed first in seven of the ten events. He is now only the second decathlete (after Roman Šebrle) ever to break the 9,000-point barrier.  Note Eaton's 8.23 m in the long jump would have tied for second in the men's long jump final.

Women's results
Key:
.

Women track events

Women field events

Notes
 Tarmoh was initially declared the winner for third.  However, upon further review, officials announced it was indeed a dead heat between her and Felix.  At the time of the race, there was no procedure for settling such a tie.  After deliberation, USA Track & Field stated that either athlete will have the option of deferring the spot.  In that case, the relinquisher will automatically be named an alternate and the other will have the spot.  If neither athlete decides to defer, they will have the option of a coin toss or run-off to determine the winner.  If the athletes cannot reach a consensus on which method to utilize, a run-off will take place.  In the event that both athletes have no preference, a coin toss will occur.  If one athlete has a preference and the other does not, the preference will occur.  Included on the USATF leadership, inventing the procedure was USATF President Stephanie Hightower, herself the odd person out of perhaps the previous closest race decision in trials history; the 1984 women's 100 m hurdles.  Ultimately, Tarmoh decided to defer, thus giving Felix the spot.
 As a result of Rogers not having an "A" standard (31:45.00) and Flanagan opting to compete in the marathon instead (although she holds an "A" standard), fourth-place finisher Lisa Uhl (32:03.46) and seventh-place finisher Janet Cherobon-Bawcom (32:17.06) was included on the Olympic team as both were the only other runners in the race to have achieved the "A" standard from earlier competitions.
 Michta was the only American representative in the 20 km walk as she held the "B" standard (1:38:00) previously.
 Smock was the only American representative in the triple jump as she held the "B" standard (14.10 m) previously.
 Sixth-place finisher Gia Lewis-Smallwood (58.78 m) was included on the Olympic team as she held an "A" standard (63.97 m, with the standard being 62.00 m) from May.
 Fourth-place finisher Rachel Yurkovich (56.85 m) was included on the Olympic team as she held the "A" standard of at least 61.00 m.

References

External links
Official webpage at USATF
Official Tracktown webpage
Results at USATF

USA Outdoor Track and Field Championships
US Olympic Trials
Track, Outdoor
United States Summer Olympics Trials
2012 in sports in Oregon
Track and field in Oregon